Arcos de Guadalajara is a monument in Guadalajara, in the Mexican state of Jalisco.

References

External links

 

Buildings and structures in Guadalajara, Jalisco